Trivial Pursuit is a boardgame based on a player's ability to answer general knowledge and popular culture questions.

Trivial Pursuit may also refer to:

Television shows based on the board game
Trivial Pursuit (US game show)
Trivial Pursuit (UK game show)
Trivial Pursuit: America Plays
Trivial Pursuit: Unhinged, 2004 video game

See also
List of Trivial Pursuit editions